James Archibald Frear (October 24, 1861 – May 28, 1939) was a U.S. Representative from Wisconsin.

Biography
Born in Hudson, Wisconsin, in St. Croix County, Wisconsin, Frear attended the public schools, and Lawrence University, Appleton, Wisconsin, in 1878.

He moved with his parents to Washington, D.C., in 1879.
He served in the Signal Service, United States Army from 1879 to 1884.
He graduated from the National Law University, Washington, D.C., in 1884.
He was admitted to the bar the same year and commenced practice in Hudson, Wisconsin.
He was city attorney of Hudson in 1894 and 1895.
He served eleven years with the Wisconsin National Guard, retiring with the rank of colonel and judge advocate.
He was elected district attorney of St. Croix County from 1896 to 1901.
He was a member of the Wisconsin State Assembly in 1903.
He then served in the Wisconsin State Senate in 1905.
Frear became the Secretary of State of Wisconsin from 1907 to 1913.

Frear was elected as a Republican to the Sixty-third and to the ten succeeding Congresses (March 4, 1913 – January 3, 1935).  On April 5, 1917, he voted against declaring war on Germany. For his first ten terms in office he represented Wisconsin's 10th congressional district, but for his last term in office, the 73rd Congress, he redistricted and represented Wisconsin's 9th congressional district.
He was not a candidate for renomination in 1934.
He resumed the practice of law in Washington, D.C., where he died May 28, 1939.
He was interred in Arlington National Cemetery.

External links
 
 

1861 births
1939 deaths
Wisconsin state senators
Members of the Wisconsin State Assembly
Secretaries of State of Wisconsin
Lawrence University alumni
Military personnel from Wisconsin
Wisconsin National Guard personnel
National Guard (United States) colonels
Burials at Arlington National Cemetery
People from Hudson, Wisconsin
Washington, D.C., Republicans
Republican Party members of the United States House of Representatives from Wisconsin